Sumpak may refer to:
 an improvised firearm used in the Philippines 
 a fire piston, a device used to kindle a fire

Tagalog words and phrases